The Zimmerman House is a historic home located in Glenn Springs Historic District at Glenn Springs, Spartanburg County, South Carolina, United States. The home was constructed from 1852 to 1854 as the plantation house of John Conrad Zimmerman, a local entrepreneur. The home consists of a two-story frame house in a U-shaped plan. On the west and north sides, there are two-tier porticos with stuccoed doric columns on each tier. There is also a brick wellhouse with stuccoed brick arches, and a barn with a granite cornerstone.

References

Plantation houses in South Carolina
Houses completed in 1854
Houses in Spartanburg County, South Carolina